Julia Restoin Roitfeld (born 12 November 1980) is a French creative director and designer, based between New York City and London. She is the daughter of Carine Roitfeld and Christian Restoin.

Career
She graduated from Parsons School of Design in 2006, with a BBA in Design Management, where she honed her design credentials and  developed her passion for photography and art direction. She has interned and worked for international's creative agencies Baron and Baron and Laird and Partner's. Since then Julia has consulted for some of the world's most prestigious brands including Peter Som, Zac Posen, Jean-Paul Gaultier, and Miu Miu, designed the packaging for Royal Fern Beauty and overseen the creative Direction of products for children's book Pat the Bunny  She also designed a lingerie collection for Kiki de Montparnasse (2011), a capsule collection for Chinese high street brand Me and City (2011), a children's clothing collection in collaboration with LoveShackFancy (2014) and a travel set for luxury travel accessory brand, Away (2018).

While Julia enjoys working behind the scenes, she has also fronted campaigns and modeled for international brands, including Givenchy, Lancôme, and Tom Ford and was featured on international publication covers such as ID, Elle, Madame Figaro, international editions of Vogue, Tatler, Grazia, and Harper's Bazaar.

She is also the founder  of two online lifestyle platforms: Romy and The Bunnies, which provides inspiration for the modern parent and most recently Less is More, a sustainability platform displaying a glamorous approach to a minimal and more sustainable lifestyle.

More recently Julia has designed a sustainable collection for the iconic Parisian fashion house Herve Leger which will be available in May 2021. In 2020 Julia used her discerning eye to curate a lingerie edit with Coco De Mer enlisting friend and photographer Laura Bailey to shoot the campaign. In 2019 Julia designed a limited-edition capsule collection of eveningwear for The Outnet's in-house brand Iris and Ink, which sold out globally.

Personal life
In May 2012, she announced the birth of her daughter Romy.

Roitfeld has been dating songwriter, singer and guitarist for Northern Irish alternative rock band Ash, Tim Wheeler, since 2018. On September 9, 2021, they announced via Instagram that they were expecting a baby together. In February 2022, they announced the birth of their son George.

Her younger brother is the art dealer Vladimir Restoin Roitfeld.

References

French female models
French fashion designers
French people of Russian-Jewish descent
Living people
1980 births
Next Management models
French women fashion designers